Letlotlo Sesele (born 23 March 1988) is a South African first-class cricketer who plays for the Knights cricket team.

References

External links
 

1988 births
Living people
South African cricketers
Knights cricketers
Boland cricketers
Free State cricketers
Griqualand West cricketers
Northern Cape cricketers
South Western Districts cricketers
Cricketers from Bloemfontein